The patrikios Makroioannes ("long John", evidently a sobriquet) was a Byzantine naval commander who commanded the fleet in the expedition of Malakenos in 950/1 to southern Italy. The Byzantine expeditionary corps united with the local forces of the strategos of Calabria, Paschalios, but suffered a crushing defeat by the Fatimids under al-Hasan ibn Ali al-Kalbi and the eunuch Faraj Muhaddad at Gerace on 7 May 952. The Byzantine commanders themselves were nearly captured. Nothing further is known of Makroioannes.

References

Sources
 
 
 

10th-century Byzantine military personnel
Byzantine admirals
Byzantine Italy
Byzantine people of the Arab–Byzantine wars
Patricii